Peter Barfuß (born 11 April 1944) is a German former footballer.

Barfuß made one appearance for Hamburger SV in the Bundesliga during his playing career.

References

External links 
 

1944 births
Living people
German footballers
Association football defenders
Bundesliga players
Hamburger SV players